The 2021 Junior and Cadet World Fencing Championships took place from 3 to 11 April 2021 in Cairo, Egypt.

Medal summary

Junior

Men

Women

Cadet

Men

Women

Medal table

References

External links
 Official website
 Results

Junior World Fencing Championships
Junior
Fencing
Fencing
International fencing competitions hosted by Egypt
Sports competitions in Cairo
Fencing